Mountain View High School is a public high school located in Quicksburg, Shenandoah County, Virginia, United States. It is home to almost 625 students, in grades 8-12. The school is part of the Shenandoah County Public School System.  Mike Dorman is the current principal.

On July 9, 2020, the Shenandoah County School Board voted to rename the school, which was previously called Stonewall Jackson High School.

The school's colors are red, black, and white, and the school mascot is "the Generals."

History
Mountain View High School was dedicated on April 24, 1960, according to school board minutes. It was opened to students during the 1959-1960 school year, as one of the three newly consolidated schools in the county. Thomas L. Snyder was approved as the first principal of the high school. The first year's enrollment in grades 8-12 was 501. There were originally nineteen classrooms. In 1964, four classrooms were added while one was lost in becoming the guidance office. Major construction was done in 1993, with six classrooms added which became known as the science wing.

Renovations were done and new additions were built in 2004. Each existing classroom was renovated and air conditioning was installed. New construction consisted of a gymnasium, four locker rooms, weight room, wrestling room, indoor/outdoor concession stand, PE offices, training room, laundry room, band room, chorus room, library media center, office suite, guidance office suite, clinic, expanded cafeteria, seven new classrooms, and a teacher's workroom.

Starting in the 2018–2019 school year, 8th grade was returned to the high school to accommodate for overcrowding.

On July 9, 2020, the Shenandoah County School Board voted to change the school's name, as it was originally named for Thomas "Stonewall" Jackson, a Civil War general who fought for the Confederacy. The school board also voted to change the name of Ashby-Lee Elementary School and to remove the "Rebel" mascot from North Fork Middle School. This was part of the Board's next steps for a resolution condemning racism and affirming the division's commitment to an inclusive school environment for all. Residents circulated petitions both for and against the name changes. One petition in support of the name changes garnered more than 2,000 signatures, while another petition against the name changes garnered more than 3,000 signatures. Committees made up of parents, citizens, staff, and students presented recommendations for new names and mascots to the School Board in December 2020, with a School Board vote at the January 14, 2021 meeting, 6-0, in favor of changing the name of the school to Mountain View High School.

On June 10, 2022, after three school board members running on a platform against teaching Critical Race Theory in schools were elected, a vote to restore the Stonewall Jackson name was defeated in a 3-3 vote.

Clubs
Art Guild/National Art Honor Society
Future Farmers of America (FFA)
Home Economics Club
Interact Club
National Honor Society (NHS)
Student Council Association (SCA)
World Languages Club
Recycling Club
Knitting Club
Debate Club
Chess and Board Games Club

Sports

Cross Country
Boys 
Varsity Cross Country
JV Cross Country
Girls 
Varsity Cross Country
JV Cross Country
Football 
Varsity
JV
Baseball 
Soccer
Cheerleading 
Volleyball
Tennis
Golf
Basketball

References

External links

Shenandoah County Public Schools
Course Offerings

Public high schools in Virginia
Schools in Shenandoah County, Virginia
Educational institutions established in 1959
1959 establishments in Virginia